Değirmenkaya can refer to:

 Değirmenkaya, Kalecik
 Değirmenkaya, Karayazı
 Değirmenkaya, Seben